The Baker County School District, also known as the Baker County School System, is a public school district in Baker County, Georgia, United States, based in Newton. It serves the communities of Elmodel and Newton.

Schools
The district has one school serving pre-school to grade twelve. It is the Baker County School.

History
Prior to court-ordered integration of the public schools, separate schools were maintained for white and black students. In 1972, the courts found the school board had skirted integration by selling buses and other public resources including West Baker Elementary Schools to private Baker Academy at a loss. Around the late 1980s, students typically attended neighboring Mitchell County schools. In more recent years they have returned to a new school built in Newton: the Baker County K12 School.

Gallery

References

External links
 

School districts in Georgia (U.S. state)
Education in Baker County, Georgia